Sleeper is a 1973 American science fiction comedy film parodying a dystopic future of the United States in 2173, directed by Woody Allen and written by Allen and Marshall Brickman. The plot involves the misadventures of the owner of a health food store who is cryogenically frozen in 1973 and defrosted 200 years later in an ineptly led police state. Contemporary politics and pop culture are satirized throughout the film, which includes tributes to the classic comedy of Buster Keaton, Harold Lloyd, and Charlie Chaplin.  Many elements of notable works of science fiction are also paid tribute to, or parodied.

Plot
Miles Monroe (Woody Allen) is a jazz musician and owner of the "Happy Carrot" health-food store in New York City's Greenwich Village.  He walks into the hospital in 1973 for a routine operation, which goes wrong, leaving him relegated to 200 years of anonymous cryopreservation. Two scientists in 2173 (played by Bartlett Robinson and Mary Gregory) illegally revive him. They are members of an underground rebellion at odds with the police state the United States had become after the massive destruction caused when "a man named Albert Shanker got hold of a nuclear warhead.". 
It is ostensibly ruled by a dictator known only as "The Leader", and about to implement a secret plan known as the "Aries Project". The rebels hope to use Miles as a spy to infiltrate and derail it, as he is the only member of the dystopian society without a known biometric identity.

The authorities grow suspicious and arrive in force to question the scientists, who are arrested and taken to have their brains "simplified". Miles escapes by disguising himself as a robot, which is then randomly delivered to work in the home of idle socialite Luna Schlosser (Diane Keaton). When Luna decides to have her new butler's rather unattractive head replaced with something more "aesthetically pleasing", Miles reveals his true identity.  Spooked at his disclosure and unsympathetic to the rebels, she threatens to turn him in to the authorities. In response, Miles kidnaps her and goes on the run, searching for the Aries Project.

After much bickering, Miles and Luna fall in love. Miles is captured and brainwashed into becoming a complacent member of society, while Luna escapes and joins the rebellion. The rebels kidnap Miles and perform successful reverse-brainwashing. Miles falls into the routine of rebel life, but grows jealous when he catches Luna kissing the handsome, hunky rebel leader, Erno Windt (John Beck), and she announces that she has come to believe in free love.

Miles tries to win Luna back.  Eventually he and Luna infiltrate the Aries Project, wherein they quickly learn that the national Leader had been killed by a rebel bomb ten months previously. All that survives is his nose. Miles and Luna disguise themselves as doctors, resulting in a case of mistaken identity, causing them to be placed in charge of cloning the Leader from his sole remaining part.  Miles steals the nose and deadends the government's cloning scheme by dropping the nose in the path of a road roller.

The pair escape, and later debate their future together. Miles tells Luna that Erno will inevitably become as corrupt as the Leader, as that is how all revolutions end up. Miles and Luna confess their love for one another, but she claims that science has proven men and women cannot have meaningful relationships due to chemical incompatibilities. Miles dismisses this, saying that he does not believe in science. Luna then points out that he does not believe in God or political systems either, and asks if there is anything he does believe in.  He responds, "Sex and death — two things that come once in a lifetime — but at least after death you're not nauseous." The two embrace and kiss.

Cast
 Woody Allen as Miles Monroe, the former owner of a health food store from the 1970s
 Diane Keaton as Luna Schlosser, an artist from the 22nd century
 Don Keefer as Doctor Tryon, one of the two scientists who oversee Miles's rehabilitation from cryosleep
 Bartlett Robinson and Mary Gregory as Doctor Orva and Doctor Melik, respectively, the scientists who oversee Miles's rehabilitation from cryosleep; both are captured by the government and taken away
 John Beck as Erno Windt, the Leader of the rebellion
 Douglas Rain as the voice of Bio Central Computer 2100, Series G, the computer aiding in Our Leader's cloning.

The image of Timothy Leary is used for Our Leader

Production
Much of the film was shot in and around Denver, Colorado. The outdoor shots of the hospital were filmed at the Mesa Laboratory of the National Center for Atmospheric Research in Boulder, Colorado. There is a brief shot of the main building of the Denver Botanic Gardens and of the concrete lamp posts.  Other scenes were filmed in Los Angeles, Monterey and at the Culver City Studios.

The Sculptured House, designed by architect Charles Deaton, is a private home located on Genesee Mountain near Genesee Park, west of Denver. The Mile Hi Church of Religious Science in Lakewood, Colorado was turned into a futuristic McDonald's, featuring a sign counting the number sold: 795 followed by 51 zeroes.

Author Christopher Turner has suggested that the orgasmatron, the electromechanical device that Monroe encounters, was a parody of Wilhelm Reich's orgone accumulator.

Science fiction author Ben Bova was an uncredited science advisor to the film.

Reception
Sleeper opened at the Coronet and Little Carnegie theatres in New York City on December 17, 1973. It received positive reviews. On Rotten Tomatoes the film has a 100% approval rating based on 34 reviews, with an average rating of 8.03/10. The site's critical consensus reads, "In Sleeper, Woody Allen's madcap futurist comedy, practically each joke and one-liner hits its target."

Vincent Canby, in The New York Times, called the film "terrific", saying it "confidently advances the Allen art into slapstick territory that I associate with the best of Laurel and Hardy. It's the kind of film comedy that no one in Hollywood has done with style in many years, certainly not since Jerry Lewis began to take himself seriously. Sleeper is a comic epic that recalls the breathless pace and dizzy logic of the old two-reelers." Roger Ebert gave the film 3½ out of four stars, saying Allen "gives us moments in Sleeper that are as good as anything since the silent films of Buster Keaton."

Soundtrack
The movie's rapid pace and often slapstick action is mirrored by a lively soundtrack composed heavily of Dixieland-style jazz, much of it performed by members of the Preservation Hall Jazz Band.  Allen, an amateur clarinetist with a regular weekly gig as a member of the "Ragtime Rascals" at Michael's Pub in midtown Manhattan, sat in with the Band.  The New Orleans Funeral and Ragtime Orchestra was also featured.  Additional recording was done at Michael's.

Accolades
In 1973, the film was awarded the Hugo Award for Best Dramatic Presentation at Discon II, the 32nd World Science Fiction Convention, in Washington, D.C.

In 2000, readers of Total Film magazine voted Sleeper the 30th Greatest Comedy Film of All Time.

In 2000, American Film Institute included the film in its list AFI's 100 Years...100 Laughs (#80).

In October 2013, the film was voted by readers of the UK's The Guardian as the tenth best film directed by Allen.

Film as tribute
Aspects of the film's storyline are similar to the plot of the 1910 H. G. Wells novel The Sleeper Awakes.

In 1001 Movies You Must See Before You Die, Kim Newman writes that Sleepers "vision of the future [is] informed by films like 2001: A Space Odyssey (1968), A Clockwork Orange (1971), THX 1138 (1971), and Z.P.G. (1972)."

The anthem sung by the rebels ("Rebels are we, ...") is the same as the one sung by the guerrillas in Allen's 1971 film Bananas.

Douglas Rain, who provided the voice of HAL 9000 in the 1968 film 2001: A Space Odyssey, voiced the medical computer in Sleeper.

In a 2007 interview, Allen stated that Sleeper was made as a tribute to the comedians whom he deeply admired, including Groucho Marx and Bob Hope.

See also
 List of American films of 1973
 List of films with a 100% rating on Rotten Tomatoes
Idiocracy, a science-fiction comedy film by Mike Judge where the protagonist is mistakenly cryogenically preserved for 500 years.

References

External links

 
 
 

1973 films
1970s science fiction comedy films
American science fiction comedy films
American satirical films
Films directed by Woody Allen
Cryonics in fiction
American dystopian films
Films set in the 22nd century
Films shot in Colorado
Films set in 1973
Fiction set in the 2170s
Hugo Award for Best Dramatic Presentation winning works
United Artists films
Android (robot) films
Nebula Award for Best Script-winning works
Films with screenplays by Woody Allen
Films with screenplays by Marshall Brickman
Cultural depictions of Marlon Brando
1973 comedy films
1970s English-language films
1970s American films